Alexander Lowen (December 23, 1910 – October 28, 2008) was an American physician and psychotherapist.

Life 
A student of Wilhelm Reich in the 1940s and early '50s in New York, Lowen developed bioenergetic analysis, a form of mind-body psychotherapy, with his then-colleague, John Pierrakos (February 8, 1921 – February 1, 2001). He is also noted for developing the concept of bioenergetic grounding, one of the foundational principles of bioenergetic therapy. Lowen was the founder and former executive director of the International Institute for Bioenergetic Analysis in New York City. The IIBA now has over 1500 members and 54 training institutes worldwide.

Born in New York City to Jewish immigrants, Lowen received a bachelor's degree in science and business from City College of New York, an LL.B and a J.S.D (a doctorate in law) from Brooklyn Law School. His interest in the link between the mind and the body developed during this time. He enrolled in a class on character analysis with Wilhelm Reich. After training to be a therapist himself, Lowen moved to Switzerland to attend the University of Geneva.

Lowen lived and practiced for the majority of his life in New Canaan, Connecticut. He had a stroke in July 2006. The Alexander Lowen Foundation was founded in April 2007 to continue his legacy. Lowen died on October 28, 2008, at the age of 97.

In 2007, Dr. Lowen established the Alexander Lowen Foundation, which is now directed by his son, Frederic Lowen.

Bibliography
Dr. Lowen authored 14 books as well as numerous articles and other professional abstracts.

The Language of the Body (1958)
Love and Orgasm (1965)
The Betrayal of the Body (1967)
Pleasure (1970)
Depression and the Body: The Biological Basis of Faith and Reality (1972)
Bioenergetics (1975)
The Way to Vibrant Health: A Manual of Bioenergetic Exercises, co-author Leslie Lowen (1977)
Fear of Life (1980)
Narcissism: Denial of the True Self (1984)
Love, Sex and Your Heart (1988)
The Spirituality of the Body (1990)
Joy (1995)
Honoring the Body: The Autobiography of Alexander Lowen, M.D. (2004)
The Voice of the Body (2005)

See also 
 Esalen Institute
 Posture (psychology)

Notes

External links
The Alexander Lowen Foundation, contains historical material
International Institute of Bioenergetic Analysis

1910 births
2008 deaths
Body psychotherapy
American psychotherapists
American psychiatrists
American psychology writers
American male non-fiction writers
American health and wellness writers
Brooklyn Law School alumni
City College of New York alumni
University of Geneva alumni
People from New Canaan, Connecticut
Jewish scientists
20th-century American Jews
Narcissism writers
21st-century American Jews